Ali Nemati (born 8 April 1995) is an Iranian professional footballer who plays as a defender for Persian Gulf Pro League club Persepolis.

Club career

Persepolis 
On 24 August 2021, Nemati signed a three-year contract with Persian Gulf Pro League champions Persepolis.

Style of play 
A hard-working, aggressive, disciplined, and header defender, Nemati is known for his discipline and hard-tackling style of play. While playing for Persepolis, after scoring 4 goals for the team, he mentioned as a good header in the sport media of the country. He also has the ability to play in the left-back.

Career statistics

Honours 
Perspolis
Iranian Super Cup Runner-up (1): 2021

References

External links 

 
 Ali Nemati at eurosport
 
 Ali Nemati at PersianLeague.com

Shahr Khodro F.C. players
People from Nishapur
1995 births
Living people
Iranian footballers
Association football defenders
Persepolis F.C. players
Persian Gulf Pro League players